MRCI may refer to:

Microsoft Realtime Compression Interface, an optional hardware interface for Microsoft DoubleSpace/DriveSpace
Multireference configuration interaction, a method in quantum chemistry